Israel Castro Franco (born April 11, 1975) is a former professional footballer who played as a striker. Born in Brazil, he represented the El Salvador national team.

Club career
Castro spent the majority of his career in his adopted homeland El Salvador, mostly twice at Luis Ángel Firpo. He also played in his native Brazil and for a short period of time with the Portuguese lower league outfit Imortal de Albufeira.

International career
Castro became a Salvadoran citizen in 1996. He made his debut for the El Salvador national team in an August 1997 FIFA World Cup qualification match against Costa Rica and has earned a total of 13 caps, scoring 3 goals. He thus participated in the 1998 FIFA World Cup campaign, playing four matches in the process, under the popular Serbian coach Milovan Đorić and represented his country at the 1998 CONCACAF Gold Cup.

His final international was a November 1998 friendly match against Honduras.

Career statistics
Scores and results list El Salvador's goal tally first.

Honours
Atlético Paranaense
 Campeonato Paranaense: 2000

Luis Ángel Firpo
 Salvadoran Primera División: 1997-98

References

External links

1975 births
Living people
Salvadoran people of Brazilian descent
Brazilian emigrants to El Salvador
Naturalized citizens of El Salvador
Salvadoran footballers
Brazilian footballers
Footballers from Curitiba
Association football forwards
El Salvador international footballers
1998 CONCACAF Gold Cup players
C.D. Luis Ángel Firpo footballers
Clube Atlético Juventus players
Club Athletico Paranaense players
Imortal D.C. players
Associação Atlética Portuguesa (RJ) players
C.D. Chalatenango footballers
San Salvador F.C. footballers
Once Municipal footballers
Salvadoran expatriate footballers
Salvadoran expatriate sportspeople in Portugal
Expatriate footballers in Portugal